Results from the 1987 Monaco Grand Prix Formula Three held at Monte Carlo on May 30, 1987, in the Circuit de Monaco.

Classification 

Monaco Grand Prix Formula Three